Events from the year 1527 in Sweden

Incumbents
 Monarch – Gustav I

Events
 The Swedish Reformation is initiated.  All sermons in henceforth to be held in the native language, the military power of the bishops is dissolved, all goods belonging to the Catholic convents is open to confiscation by the crown and the relatives of those who once donated it to the convent in accordance with the Reduction of Gustav I of Sweden, and Catholic convents are banned from accepting new novices without a special dispensation from the crown.
 Dissolution of the St. Clare's Priory, Stockholm
 Dissolution of the Vårfruberga Abbey 
 The second of the Dalecarlian Rebellions.

Births

Deaths

 Sigrid Eskilsdotter (Banér), landowner and grandmother of the king
 Anna Swenonis, manuscript illuminator

References

 
Years of the 16th century in Sweden
Sweden